Harold Albert Baker (born October 4, 1929) is a former United States district judge of the United States District Court for the Central District of Illinois, with chambers in Urbana, Illinois. He was originally appointed to the United States District Court for the Eastern District of Illinois in 1978 by Jimmy Carter and then reassigned to the newly-created Central District in 1979. He became a senior judge in 1994. He was also a judge of the United States Foreign Intelligence Surveillance Court until 2005.

Education and career
Born in 1929, in Mt. Kisco, New York, Baker attended Columbia University, then received an Artium Baccalaureus degree from the University of Illinois at Urbana–Champaign in 1951. He was in the United States Navy from 1951 to 1953, obtaining the rank of Lieutenant. He received a Juris Doctor from University of Illinois College of Law in 1956. He was in private practice of law in Champaign, Illinois, from 1956 to 1978, and was an adjunct faculty member of the University of Illinois College of Law from 1972 to 1978. He was senior counsel for the United States President's Commission on CIA activities within the United States in 1975.

Federal judicial service
Baker was nominated by President Jimmy Carter on August 9, 1978, to a seat vacated by Judge Henry Seiler Wise on the United States District Court for the Eastern District of Illinois. Baker was confirmed by the United States Senate on September 22, 1978, and received his commission on September 23, 1978. In 1978, the Eastern District and Southern District of Illinois were rearranged into the Southern District and Central District of Illinois. Baker was reassigned to the United States District Court for the Central District of Illinois on March 31, 1979, by operation of law. In the Central District he served as Chief Judge from 1984 to 1991, and assumed senior status on October 4, 1994. Baker was on the United States Foreign Intelligence Surveillance Court from May 18, 1995 to May 18, 2005, having been appointed by Chief Justice William Rehnquist. FISC judges serve seven-year terms.

References

External links

 
 Judges Testimony at Senate FISA Hearing: The Transcripts — transcripts of several former FISC judges, including Baker, in front of the Senate Judiciary Committee

1929 births
Living people
20th-century American judges
21st-century American judges
Columbia University alumni
Judges of the United States District Court for the Eastern District of Illinois
Judges of the United States District Court for the Central District of Illinois
Judges of the United States Foreign Intelligence Surveillance Court
People from Mount Kisco, New York
United States district court judges appointed by Jimmy Carter
United States Navy officers
University of Illinois College of Law alumni
University of Illinois faculty